Edgar Prestage  (1869–1951) was a British historian and Portuguese scholar.

Biography
Born in Manchester on 20 July 1869, he served as professor of Portuguese at King's College, London between 1923 and 1936, and had authored over a hundred publications. He died in London on 3 March 1951. In his obituary, he was described as "Britain's leading authority of his era on Portuguese literature and history".

Honours
 Grand Officer of the Order of Saint James of the Sword, Portugal (2 September 1930)

References

External links

 
 
 

1869 births
1951 deaths
British historians
Contributors to the Catholic Encyclopedia
Translators to English
Grand Officers of the Order of Saint James of the Sword